Landal GreenParks is a European network of holiday villages, with locations in the Netherlands, Austria, Belgium, the Czech Republic, Denmark, Germany, Hungary, Switzerland and the United Kingdom.

Background
The company owns 106 holiday villages, which contain over 15,000 bungalows. Its headquarters is in Leidschendam, in the Netherlands. Landal GreenParks has 44 holiday villages in the Netherlands, and is therefore the biggest in its kind. Of the other 16 villages, 6 contain campsites, with a total of 1,500 places to stay. About 3,000 people work at the company.

Landal GreenParks aims to be climate neutral by 2030. It has partnered with environmental organizations, for example, to improve biodiversity.

History
The company was founded in 1954, when the Dutch company "Nillmij" bought up the Dutch holiday village "Rabbit Hill". Initially, it was meant to provide the houses to staff of the company, but because there was only a small number of these, people from outside the company were permitted to rent a bungalow, where they could celebrate their holiday. This became attractive, and more villages built. The first village abroad appeared in 1965 in Germany.

The Nillmij company was rebranded, after  several mergers since 1969, to "ENNIA". All holiday villages changed their name to ENNIA as well. In 1983, ENNIA merged with "AGO", and together, they formed the new company Aegon N.V. Every holiday village had to be renamed because of this merging. After several more companies merged, it was decided that the "Aegon Recreatie Holding B.V." had to be sold. On 18 July 1996, all holiday villages were sold to a group of investors, who were operating as Landal GreenParks.

In 2002, Landal GreenParks acquired Beheer & Projecten (literally: Manage & Projects) from Groningen, including the management of 34 holiday villages of Gran Dorado, from Pierre & Vacances (the parent company of Center Parcs). Originally Pierre & Vacances wanted to exploit the villages by themselves, but the Dutch authority didn't allow this. When the small villages from Creative Holiday Parks (taken over from Gran Dorado resorts in 1997) were taken over by Landal GreenParks, this company became the largest of holiday villages, while Gran Dorado and Center Parcs had this title first.

The company was part of Wyndham Destination Network, which is a business unit of Wyndham Worldwide. In 2018, Wyndham sold the company to Platinum Equity.

In July 2021, it was announced that Roompot would buy Landal GreenParks, subject to regulatory approval which was still pending in November 2021. In November 2021, following a strong summer of staycations, Landal announced that they would be adding nine more parks in the United Kingdom.

Awards
Landal Darwin Forest won gold in VisitEngland's Awards for Excellence 2020 in the holiday park category. Landal Sandybrook is a finalist in VisitEngland's Awards for Excellence 2022.

References

External links
 Landal Greenparks

Holiday villages
Travel and holiday companies of the Netherlands